The American Public Works Association (APWA) is a nonprofit, professional association of public works agencies, private companies, and individuals dedicated to promoting professional excellence and public awareness through education, advocacy and the exchange of knowledge. APWA is headquartered in Kansas City, Missouri and has an office in Washington, D.C.

History
APWA was chartered in the United States in 1937. Membership in APWA is open to any individual, agency, or corporation with an interest in public works and infrastructure issues. There are 55 chapters present in the United States and 8 chapters present in Canada.

References

Organizations based in Kansas City, Missouri
Professional associations based in the United States
Organizations established in 1937
Civil engineering professional associations